Callicerus is a genus of beetles belonging to the family Staphylinidae.

The species of this genus are found in Europe and Northern America.

Species:
 Callicerus appenninus Assing, 2001 
 Callicerus atricollis (Aubé, 1850)

References

Staphylinidae
Staphylinidae genera